David Wachs (born July 25, 1980) is an American actor and musician. He was born and raised in Palm Desert, California to parents who were both musicians. He has appeared in several TV shows, including ER, Living with Fran, Still Standing, as well as in films such as Hotel California (2008), The Last Hurrah (2009), among others.

External links
 
 

1980 births
Living people
21st-century American male actors
Male actors from California
American male film actors
American male television actors
Musicians from California
People from Palm Desert, California